is a football club based in Hachinohe, a city in the southeastern part of Aomori Prefecture in Japan. They currently play in the J3 League, Japanese third tier of professional football.

Name origin
The name Vanraure comes from the combination of two Italian words: derivante, meaning "origin"; and australe, meaning "southern". It thus refers to the origin of the club in the southern area of Hachinohe, in the former village of Nangō.

History
The club was founded in 2006 as a merger of two football clubs; Hachinohe Industry SC (八戸工業サッカークラブ) and Nango FC (南郷FC) and joined Tōhoku League Division 2 North. Since 2008 the club's aim was to become a professional club and join J.League. In 2011, because of  Tōhoku earthquake and tsunami, the two blocks of Tōhoku Division 2 temporarily merge into a single group, with no promotion, and Vanraure won the merged Division 2 title for the first time. In 2012 they were back to Division 2 North and they were only able to finish in second place to Ganju Iwate but won the promotion playoff against Cobaltore Onagawa, who were also promoted because Fukushima United gained promotion to JFL.

With the introduction of J3 League for 2014, the club applied for J. League Associate Membership in June 2013  and got the approval in September 2013. But because of the stadium not met the requirements yet, their J3 license has been postponed until next evaluation in 2014 and only can get promotion to J3 until 2015.

Because of vacancies left by some clubs that made up the J3 League, JFL had to select other clubs besides the 2013 Regional League promotion series winners who have submitted an application. Vanraure was selected as one of four clubs by application to get promotion and competed in JFL for the first time in 2014. In July 2015, Vanraure won the Apertura Championship but lost to Clausura champion Sony Sendai FC on penalties in the two-leg championship stage after a tie on aggregate.

After a couple of attempts, Vanraure finally got promoted to J3 League in 2018; they achieved 3rd place behind Honda FC and FC Osaka, a sufficient result to unlock a professional spot for 2019.

Vanraure Hachinohe acquired a J2 license on 2021, was approved promotion to the J2 once the club finishes the season in the promotion zone.

League & cup record

Key

Honours

 Japan Football League
 Apertura Champions (1) : 2015
 Runners-up (1): 2015
 Tōhoku League Division 1
 Runners-up (1): 2013
 Tōhoku League Division 2 North
 Runners-up (2): 2010, 2012
 Tōhoku League Division 2
 Winners (1): 2011

Current squad

As of 9 January 2023.

Club officials
For the 2023 season.

Managerial history

Kit evolution

References

External links
Official Site (Japanese)

 
Football clubs in Japan
J.League clubs
Sports teams in Aomori Prefecture
Japan Football League clubs
Hachinohe
Association football clubs established in 2006
2006 establishments in Japan